The restinga tyrannulet (Phylloscartes kronei) is a species of bird in the family Tyrannidae, the tyrant flycatchers. It is endemic to Brazil, on the south Atlantic coast centered on the state of Paraná in a 150 km wide coastal strip. Its natural habitats are subtropical or tropical dry shrubland and subtropical or tropical moist shrubland. It is threatened by habitat loss.

References

External links
BirdLife Species Factsheet.
Restinga tyrannulet videos on the Internet Bird Collection
Restinga tyrannulet photo gallery VIREO

restinga tyrannulet
Birds of the Atlantic Forest
Endemic birds of Brazil
restinga tyrannulet
Taxonomy articles created by Polbot